Who's Kissing Madeleine? (German: Wer küßt Madeleine?) is a 1939 German comedy film directed by Victor Janson and starring Magda Schneider, Albert Matterstock and Herti Kirchner.

The film's sets were designed by the art director Willy Schiller. Location shooting took place at Rangsdorf near Berlin.

Synopsis
A French pilot's head is filled with thoughts of his wife flirting with other men in his absence, his mind focusing on three particular candidates. However she is in turn suspicious that he may be having an affair.

Cast
 Magda Schneider as Madeleine Pasqual  
 Albert Matterstock as Pierre Pasqual  
 Herti Kirchner as Francoise de Villiers  
 Hermann Speelmans as Maurice Duroi 
 Ernst Waldow as Gaston de Villiers  
 Albert Florath as Polizeipräfekt  
 Herbert Hübner as Courbierre  
 Wolf Kersten as Victor  
 Julia Serda as Ellinor Vanderstift  
 Paul Bildt as Polizeikommissar  
 Paul Dahlke as Kommissar Watson  
 Paul Westermeier as Polizist Batier  
 Ilse Fürstenberg as Dorothy Simplon  
 Rudolf Platte as Sänger im Café 
 Heinrich Marlow as Chef von Rousseau & Rousseau  
 F.W. Schröder-Schrom as Direktor des Flugdienstes  
 Ernst G. Schiffner as Polizist  
 Charlotte Schellhorn as Toinette  
 Ilse Petri as Suzette  
 Ethel Reschke as Hausmädchen Paulette  
 Armin Schweizer as Wachhabender

References

Bibliography 
 James Robert Parish. Film Actors Guide. Scarecrow Press, 1977.

External links 
 

1939 comedy films
German comedy films
1939 films
Films of Nazi Germany
1930s German-language films
Films directed by Victor Janson
Terra Film films
Films set in France
Films set in London
German black-and-white films
1930s German films